The East Midlands Ambulance Service NHS Trust (EMAS) provides emergency medical services, urgent care and patient transport services for the 4.8million people within the East Midlands region of the UK - covering Nottinghamshire, Derbyshire (except Glossop, Hadfield and Tintwistle), Leicestershire, Rutland, Lincolnshire (including North Lincolnshire and North East Lincolnshire) and Northamptonshire. It was formed in 1999 by amalgamating several county ambulance services, and in July 2006 was dissolved and reformed under the same name as part of a nationwide reorganisation of ambulance service provision.

Performance
In 201617, EMAS received over 938,837 emergency 999 calls with ambulance clinicians dispatched to 653,215 incidents.

EMAS employs about 3,290 staff at more than 70 locations, including two control rooms at Nottingham and Lincoln - the largest staff group are those who provide accident and emergency responses to 999 calls.

In 2013, EMAS took on 140 new emergency care assistants. In 2014, EMAS announced they were bringing back the ambulance technician role.

In 201011, EMAS missed key performance targets after a cold spell brought snow and ice. By June 2015, EMAS had failed to meet their category 1 response times for the fifth successive year.

In December 2019, ambulance staff spent 13,057 hours waiting at hospitals for the pre-handover of patients, more than double the time spend in December 2018.

CQC performance rating
In its last inspection of the service in April 2019, the Care Quality Commission (CQC) gave the following ratings on a scale of outstanding (the service is performing exceptionally well), good (the service is performing well and meeting our expectations), requires improvement (the service isn't performing as well as it should) and inadequate (the service is performing badly):

Funding
EMAS previously provided patient transport services until contracts worth £20million per year were taken over in 2012 by two private sector companies. In 2012−13, EMAS had a budget of £148M. The trust spent £4.3M on voluntary and private ambulance services in 201314 for support in busy periods. 

In 2015, the service also faced a drop in annual funding of around £6M.

In October 2014, the trust decided to spend £88,000 on upgrading its computer equipment.

In 2018, the trust said it would need an extra £20M a year to meet the new ambulance performance standards.

See also
 Emergency medical services in the United Kingdom

References

External links
 
 Inspection reports from the Care Quality Commission

Health in Lincolnshire
Health in Leicestershire
Health in Nottinghamshire
Health in Northamptonshire
NHS ambulance services trusts
Ambulance services in England